"Ice Cream" is a 2011 single by Battles. It consists of two versions of the song "Ice Cream" (one excluding vocals by Matias Aguayo) and a song which did not feature on the LP, entitled "Black Sundome". The single was released in a limited edition with three different album covers and matching vinyl (Strawberry, Banana and Chocolate). The song was also included on the group's second full-length album Gloss Drop.

Pitchfork placed "Ice Cream" at number 47 in its list of "The Top 100 Tracks of 2011".

Track listing

References

2011 singles
Battles (band) songs